Luigi dal Verme (died 1449) was an Italian condottiero.

The son of the condottiero Jacopo dal Verme, initially he followed the latter's campaigns, then fought in the company of Muzio Attendolo in the war against Joan II of Naples. Later he was hired by the Bolognesi and then by the Republic of Venice. He married Luchina Bussone, daughter of condottiero Carmagnola.

After fighting in the war between the Republic of Florence and Filippo Maria Visconti, Duke of Milan, the latter give him the title of count and several fiefs. In 1437 he returned to Lombardy and, together with Niccolò Piccinino, defended Bellinzona but was defeated at Orzinuovi and Soncino. In 1446, for Visconti, he besieged Cremona with Francesco Piccinino, but was pushed back by Scaramuccia da Forlì's Venetian troops.

Later he was commander-in-chief of the Estensi army. He was defeated at Monte Brianza by Attendolo. When in 1447 the Ambrosian Republic was proclaimed, he joined Francesco Sforza in its defence, contributing to the latter's conquest of Milan. Finished the war, dal Verme obtained by him the confirmation of his fief in Lombardy.

Dal Verme was wounded in the siege of Monza and died soon afterwards, most likely of plague.

See also
Wars in Lombardy

Date of birth unknown
1449 deaths
15th-century condottieri